The freshwater anchovy (Thryssa scratchleyi) is a species of ray-finned fish in the family Engraulidae. It is endemic to Australia. Often mistaken for a minnow.

Environment
Thryssa scratchleyi is known to be found in brackish freshwaters of estuaries.

Threats
Thryssa scratchleyi is recorded to serve no threats to humans, and it is a harmless species.

Biology
Thryssa scratchleyi is recorded to be the largest anchovy known.

References

Sources
 

freshwater anchovy
Freshwater fish of Australia
Fauna of the Northern Territory
Fauna of Queensland
Freshwater fish of New Guinea
Taxa named by Edward Pierson Ramsay
Taxa named by James Douglas Ogilby
freshwater anchovy
Taxonomy articles created by Polbot